This article lists political parties in Benin. Benin has a multi-party system.

The parties

Parliamentary parties
Elected in the 2023 parliamentary election.

Other parties
Presidential Movement (Mouvance Presidentielle)
Union for Future Benin or Union of Tomorrow's Benin (Union pour le Bénin du futur)
Action Front for Renewal and Development (Front d'action pour le rénouveau et le développement, FARD-ALAFIA)
Impulse to Progress and Democracy (Impulsion au progrès et la démocratie)
Alliance MDC-PS-CPP
Movement for Development by Culture (Mouvement pour le Développement par la Culture)
Party of Salvation (Parti du Salut)
Congress of People for Progress (Congrès du Peuple pour le Progrès)
Alliance of Progress Forces (Alliance des Forces du Progrès)
Rally for Democracy and Progres (Rassemblement pour la Démocratie et le Progrès)
Amana Alliance (Alliance Amana)
Cowry Forces for an Emerging Benin (Forces Cauris pour un Bénin émergent)
Union Makes the Nation (L'Union fait la Nation) and Alliance for a Democratic Dynamic (Alliance pour une Dynamique Démocratique)
Democratic Renewal Party (Parti du renouveau démocratique)
African Movement for Development and Progress (Mouvement africain pour la dévelloppement et le progrès)
Social Democratic Party (Parti Social-Démocrate)
Benin Rebirth Party or Renaissance Party of Benin (Parti de la renaissance du Bénin)
Movement for Development and Solidarity (Mouvement pour le Développement et la Solidarité)
National Union for Democracy and Progress (Union Nationale pour la Démocratie et le Progrès)
Party for Democracy and Social Progress (Parti pour la Démocratie et le Progrès Social)
Liberal Democrats' Rally for National Reconstruction-Vivoten (Rassemblement des Démocrates Libéraux pour la Reconstruction nationale)
Star Alliance (Alliance Étoile) 
Builders and Managers of Freedom and Democracy (Bâtisseurs et Gestionnaires de la Liberté et de la Démocratie)
The Greens (Les Verts)
Union for Democracy and National Solidarity (Union pour la Démocratie et la Solidarité Nationale)
New Alliance (Nouvelle Alliance)
Rally for Progress and Renewal (Rassemblement pour le Progrès et le Renouveau)
Sun Alliance (Alliance Soleil)
Union for Relief (Union pour la Relève)
Hope Force (Force Espoir)
United Democratic Forces (Forces Démocratiques Unies)
Union for Progress and Democracy
Impulse for a New Vision of the Republic
Party for Progress and Democracy
Party for Democracy and Solidarity
Alliance for a Triumphant Benin (Alliance pour un Bénin Triomphant)
Résoatao Party (Parti RésoAtao)
African Movement for Democracy and Progress (MADEP) 
Alliance of the Social Democratic Party (PSD) 
Cameleon Alliance (AC)
Coalition of Democratic Forces
Communist Party of Benin (PCB)
Movement for Citizens' Commitment and Awakening (MERCI)
Movement for the People's Alternative (Mouvement pour une Alternative du Peuple)
Movement for Solidary Prosperity (MPS)
New Generation for the Republic (NGR)
Our Common Cause (NCC)
Parti Démocratique du Bénin (PDB)
Rally for Democracy and Pan-Africanism (RDP)
Union for Homeland and Labour (UPT)
Union for National Democracy and Solidarity (UDS)
Coalition for an Emerging Benin (Coalition pour un Bénin Emergent)
Union for Benin (Union pour le Bénin)
Alliance for Revival (Alliance Le Réveil)
Restore the Hope (Restaurer l’Espoir)

There are approximately 20 minor parties.

Defunct parties
African Congress for Renewal (DUNYA)
Alliance for Democracy and Progress (ADP) 
National Union for Solidarity and Progress (UNSP)
Key Force (Force clé)

See also
 Politics of Benin
 List of political parties by country

Benin
 
Political parties
Political parties
Benin